Heaton Luse Wrenn (January 18, 1900 – January 16, 1978) was an American rugby union player who competed in the 1920 Summer Olympics. He was a member of the American rugby union team, which won the golden medal in 1920 Summer Olympics.

References

External links 
profile

1900 births
1978 deaths
American rugby union players
Rugby union players at the 1920 Summer Olympics
Olympic gold medalists for the United States in rugby
United States international rugby union players
Medalists at the 1920 Summer Olympics